Virgile Piechocki (born 12 January 1997) is a French professional footballer who plays as a midfielder for Championnat National club Avranches.

Career
Piechocki was a full-time student who played amateur football, before he was scouted by Reims in 2015. Piechocki made his professional debut for Stade de Reims in a Ligue 2 3–0 win over Chamois Niortais on 28 April 2017.

Piechocki was part of the Reims squad that won the 2017–18 Ligue 2 and promotion to the Ligue 1 for the 2018–19 season.

In May 2021, he signed with Avranches in the Championnat National.

Honours
Reims
 Ligue 2: 2017–18

References

External links
 
 Stade de Reims Profile
 

1997 births
Living people
People from Pontarlier
Sportspeople from Doubs
Association football midfielders
French footballers
French people of Polish descent
Stade de Reims players
Gazélec Ajaccio players
Vannes OC players
US Avranches players
Ligue 2 players
Championnat National players
Championnat National 2 players
Championnat National 3 players
Footballers from Bourgogne-Franche-Comté